Bainbridge High School (BHS) is the sole comprehensive high school within the Bainbridge Island School District, serving students in grades 9–12 on Bainbridge Island, Washington.  The principal is Kristina Rodgers

Courses
Many elective courses offer opportunities outside of the normal high school course range. The school offers Advanced Placement.

Athletics
Bainbridge High School athletes, known as the Spartans, participate in the following sports throughout the school year:

Basketball
Baseball
Cheerleading
Cross country
Diving
Football
Golf
Marching band
Soccer
Softball
Swimming
Tennis
Track and field
Volleyball
Wrestling

In addition, the following club sports are available to BHS students:

Crew
Cycling
Lacrosse
Sailing
Ultimate Frisbee
Water polo

Championships
The 2006-2007 Bainbridge High School boys varsity basketball team was ranked first in the state 3A division, won the metro league regular season title, was the KingCo district tournament champion, and second-place finisher in the state 3A tournament, placing six players on post-season all-league teams.
The Bainbridge High School girls lacrosse team from 1991 to 2009 has been in sixteen Championship games, winning eleven.  And from 1994 to 2000 they won seven in a row. Most recently winning the 2007 High School Division 1 Lacrosse Championship
In 2009, Varsity Baseball 3A came second in state at Safeco Field.
The Varsity Fastpitch team won the 2009 Washington 3A State Championship, beating Holy Names Academy 6-2. The team is currently ranked 2nd in State (2010).
In 2009, the girls 1600 meter relay team set the all-time West Sound record of 3:57.88 while finishing third in the 3A WIAA State Track & Field Championships.  They finished first in the same event in 2004 and second in 2005 and 2008.
The Bainbridge High School boys soccer team won the 2011 3A Metro division 1-0 over Lakeside.
The Bainbridge High School boys soccer team placed 2nd in the 2011 Washington State 3A state playoffs falling 3-0 to Camas (who moved into the 4A division the following season).
The Bainbridge High School girls lacrosse team won the 2011 Washington State Division 1 lacrosse championship, beating Lakeside School 16-8.
The Bainbridge High School boys soccer team won the 2012 Washington State 3A state playoffs, defeating Mercer Island 3-2.
The Bainbridge High School girls Junior Varsity soccer team won the 2012 Metro League.
The Bainbridge High School girls lacrosse team won the 2012 Washington State Division 1 lacrosse championship.
The Bainbridge High School boys soccer team placed 3rd in the 2013 Washington State 3A state playoffs, defeating Hanford 3-2 in the 3rd-4th place game.
The 2013 Boys Crew took 2nd place in the Lightweight 4 event at the Junior Nationals in Oak Ridge, Tennessee.
The 2016-2017 Boys Swim took 1st place in the Metro League, 2nd place at Districts, and 1st at the state championship.
2016-2017 Boys Swimming 3A State Champions
2017-2018 Boys Swimming 3A State Champions
2018-2019 Boys Swimming 3A State Champions

*In 2010 The Marching band took 3rd place in state for parade and 1st place for music.

Student body
BHS has about 1,375 students, 46% of whom in 2010 were Washington Honors Award winners in the top 10% of the nation.
The class of 2010 had 78% of their students go to a 4-year college and 10% to a 2-year college.
The graduation rate is approximately 93%.

Notable alumni

 Laura Allenactress (All My Children, The 4400, Mona Lisa Smile, Dirt)
 Chris Benzdesigner
 Tori Black (born Michelle Chapman)award-winning pornographic actress
 Dove Cameron (non-graduate)actress (Liv and Maddie, The Mentalist, Cloud 9)
 Ben EisenhardtAmerican-Israeli professional basketball player in the Israeli Basketball Premier League
 Steven Grayprofessional European basketball player
 John D. HawkMedal of Honor recipient
 Fumiko Hayashidaactivist and Japanese-American internee
 Chris Kattanactor (Saturday Night Live, A Night at the Roxbury, The Middle, Undercover Brother)
 Kiel Reijnenprofessional cyclist in the World Tour (riding for Trek–Segafredo)
 Ben Shepherdbassist (Soundgarden) 
 Emily Silver2008 Olympic silver medalist in the 4×100 freestyle relay
 Marcel Vigneronchef (Top Chef (season 2) runner-up)
 John Wicksdrummer (Fitz and the Tantrums, Cee Lo Green, Bruno Mars, Money Mark)
 Andrew Woodlead singer of the band Mother Love Bone

References

External links
 

High schools in Kitsap County, Washington
Public high schools in Washington (state)